Anaconda is an Australian chain of retail stores, selling outdoor clothing and equipment.

In Australia the company has outlets in Western Australia, Queensland, Victoria and the Northern Territory.

References

External links
 

Australian companies established in 2004
Retail companies established in 2004
Retail companies of Australia
Recreational fishing in Australia
Sporting goods retailers of Australia